The Palmyra Public Schools are a comprehensive community public school district that serves  the residents of Palmyra, in Burlington County, New Jersey, United States. Students from Beverly and Riverton attend the district's high school as part of sending/receiving relationships with both districts.

As of the 2018–19 school year, the district, comprising two schools, had an enrollment of 953 students and 79.0 classroom teachers (on an FTE basis), for a student–teacher ratio of 12.1:1.

The district is classified by the New Jersey Department of Education as being in District Factor Group "DE", the fifth-highest of eight groupings. District Factor Groups organize districts statewide to allow comparison by common socioeconomic characteristics of the local districts. From lowest socioeconomic status to highest, the categories are A, B, CD, DE, FG, GH, I and J.

Schools
Schools in the district (with 2018–19 enrollment from the National Center for Education Statistics) are:
Elementary school
Charles Street Elementary School with 457 students in grades PreK-6
Christopher Tracey, Principal
Middle / High school
Palmyra Middle School / Palmyra High School with 468 students in grades 7-12
Lisa Sabo, High School Principal
Kenneth Holloway, Middle School Principal
Jared Toscano, Assistant Principal

In 1948, during de jure educational segregation in the United States, the district had children of all races attend the same school, but then grouped all of the black children in the same class with a black teacher.

Administration
Core members of the district's administration are:
Brian J. McBride, Superintendent
William Blatchley, Business Administrator / Board Secretary

Board of education
The district's board of education, with nine members, sets policy and oversees the fiscal and educational operation of the district through its administration. As a Type II school district, the board's trustees are elected directly by voters to serve three-year terms of office on a staggered basis, with three seats up for election each year held (since 2012) as part of the November general election. The board also includes one representative from Beverly and one from Riverton.

References

External links
Palmyra Public Schools

Palmyra Public Schools, National Center for Education Statistics

New Jersey District Factor Group DE
School districts in Burlington County, New Jersey
Palmyra, New Jersey